The 2016 Internationaux de Tennis de Blois was a professional tennis tournament played on clay courts. It was the fourth edition of the tournament which was part of the 2016 ATP Challenger Tour. It took place in Blois, France between 13 and 19 June 2016.

Singles main-draw entrants

Seeds

 1 Rankings are as of June 6, 2016.

Other entrants
The following players received wildcards into the singles main draw:
  Jonathan Eysseric
  Hugo Grenier
  Johan Tatlot
  Maxime Teixeira

The following players received entry from the qualifying draw:
  Andreas Beck 
  Scott Griekspoor
  José Hernández
  Juan Pablo Paz

The following player received entry as a lucky loser:
  Yasutaka Uchiyama

Champions

Singles

  Carlos Berlocq def.  Steve Darcis, 6–2, 6–0

Doubles

  Alexander Satschko /  Simon Stadler def.  Gong Maoxin /  Yasutaka Uchiyama, 6–3, 7–6(7–2)

External links
Official Website

Internationaux de Tennis de Blois
Internationaux de Tennis de Blois
Internationaux de Tennis de Blois